Jorge Patricio Arancibia Reyes (born 17 September 1939) is a Chilean politician and lawyer, militant from Unión Demócrata Independiente (UDI).

He was aide-de-camp of the General Augusto Pinochet.

In 2021, he was elected as a member of the Chilean Constitutional Convention. Then, he caused controversy for being part of the human rights commission due to his past in the Pinochet dictatorship.

References

External links
 BCN Profile

1939 births
Living people
Chilean people
20th-century Chilean politicians
21st-century Chilean politicians
Arturo Prat Naval Academy alumni
Independent Democratic Union politicians
Members of the Chilean Constitutional Convention
20th-century Chilean Navy personnel
Chilean Navy officers
Chilean anti-communists 
Chilean people of Basque descent